Commercial Orbital Transportation Services (COTS) was a NASA program to coordinate the development of vehicles for the delivery of crew and cargo to the International Space Station by private companies. The program was announced on January 18, 2006 and successfully flew all cargo demonstration flights by September 2013, when the program ended.

NASA's Final Report on the Commercial Orbital Transportation Services program considers it an unqualified success and a model for future public-private collaboration. Compared to traditional cost-plus contracts employed by NASA, such as the $12 billion Orion (spacecraft) contract, the unprecedented efficiency of the $800 million COTS investment resulted in "two new U.S. medium-class launch vehicles and two automated cargo spacecraft".

NASA signed COTS agreements with SpaceX and Rocketplane Kistler (RpK) in 2006, but later terminated the agreement with RpK due to insufficient private funding.  NASA then signed an agreement with Orbital Sciences in 2008.  Independently, NASA awarded contracts for cargo delivery to the International Space Station in December 2008, to Orbital Sciences and SpaceX to utilize their COTS cargo vehicles.

COTS is related but separate from the Commercial Resupply Services (CRS) program. COTS related to the development of the vehicles, CRS to the actual deliveries. COTS involved a number of Space Act Agreements, with NASA providing milestone-based payments. COTS did not involve binding contracts. CRS on the other hand does involve legally binding contracts, which means the suppliers would be liable if they failed to perform. Commercial Crew Development (CCDev) is a related program, aimed specifically at developing crew rotation services. It is similar to COTS-D. All three programs are managed by NASA's Commercial Crew and Cargo Program Office (C3PO).

Purpose
Unlike any previous NASA project, the proposed spacecraft are intended to be owned and financed primarily by the companies themselves and will be designed to serve both U.S. government agencies and commercial customers. NASA will contract for missions as its needs become clear.

This is more challenging than existent commercial space transportation because it requires precision orbit insertion, rendezvous and possibly docking with another spacecraft. The private spaceflight vendors are competing for four specific service areas:

 Capability level A: External unpressurized cargo delivery and disposal
 Capability level B: Internal pressurized cargo delivery and disposal
 Capability level C: Internal pressurized cargo delivery, return and recovery
 Capability level D: Crew Transportation (was not funded, but formed the basis of CCDev)

Program rationale
NASA explored a program for ISS services in the mid 1990s entitled "Alt Access" for Alternate Access.  While NASA funded Alt Access no further than preliminary studies, this program convinced numerous entrepreneurs that ISS could emerge as a significant market opportunity.

After years of keeping orbital transport for human spaceflight in-house, NASA concluded that firms in a free market could develop and operate such a system more efficiently and affordably than a government bureaucracy. The then NASA Administrator Michael D. Griffin stated that without affordable Commercial Orbital Transportation Services (COTS), the agency will not have enough funds remaining to achieve the objectives of the Vision for Space Exploration.  In November 2005, Dr. Griffin articulated that:

With the advent of the ISS, there will exist for the first time a strong, identifiable market for "routine" transportation service to and from LEO, and that this will be only the first step in what will be a huge opportunity for truly commercial space enterprise. We believe that when we engage the engine of competition, these services will be provided in a more cost-effective fashion than when the government has to do it.

Furthermore, if such services were unavailable by the end of 2010, NASA would've been forced to purchase orbital transportation services on foreign spacecraft such as the Russian Federal Space Agency's Soyuz and Progress spacecraft, the European Space Agency's Automated Transfer Vehicle, or the Japan Aerospace Exploration Agency's H-II Transfer Vehicle since NASA's own Crew Exploration Vehicle, since refocused, would not have been ready until 2014. 

In 2007 NASA asserted that once COTS was operational, it would no longer procure Russian cargo delivery services. 
NASA anticipates that COTS services to ISS will be necessary through at least 2015.  NASA projects at most a half-dozen COTS flights a year that would transport 10 tonnes annually. The NASA Administrator has suggested that space transportation services procurement may be expanded to orbital fuel depots and lunar surface deliveries should the first phase of COTS prove successful.

On May 22, 2012, Bill Gerstenmaier  confirmed that NASA was no longer purchasing any cargo resupply services from Russia and would rely solely on the American CRS vehicles, the SpaceX Dragon and Orbital Sciences' Cygnus; with the exception of a few vehicle-specific payloads delivered on the European ATV and the Japanese HTV.

History

Background
In 2004, NASA awarded a contract to Kistler Aerospace (which later became Rocketplane Kistler) for $227 million, despite the fact that Kistler had already filed for bankruptcy. This upset Elon Musk, as there had not been a competition and Musk could have used the funding at SpaceX. Musk protested, and NASA withdrew the contract to Kistler after the Government Accountability Office issued a ruling in support of Musk. NASA returned to the planning phase, and this eventually resulted in the COTS competition.

First round
In May 2006, NASA selected six semifinalist proposals for further evaluation: SpaceX, Andrews Space, Transformational Space Corp., Rocketplane Kistler ("RpK"), Spacehab, and SpaceDev.

On August 18, 2006, NASA's Exploration Systems Mission Directorate (ESMD) announced that SpaceX and Rocketplane Kistler won Phase I of the COTS program. NASA planned to engage winners in funded Space Act agreements through 2010.

On November 8, 2006 RpK and ATK announced that ATK would become the lead contractor for the K-1.

NASA terminated the COTS agreement with RpK in September 2007 after NASA warned RpK that it had failed to raise sufficient private funding by the July 31, 2007 deadline, freeing up $175 million from the COTS budget to be awarded to another company or companies.

Boeing submitted a proposal in conjunction with Arianespace to launch the ESA ATV module on a Delta IV rocket. Whereas the ESA launches the ATV on an Ariane 5, the two companies worked together to make this proposal. The ATV can carry up to 7.6 metric tons with a suitable launcher.

Second round
By June 18, 2007, NASA had signed separate non-reimbursable Space Act Agreements with three additional firms, Constellation Services International (CSI), SpaceDev and Spacehab. These agreements included no financial support, however NASA agreed to share information to help the companies to develop their proposed vehicles.

On October 22, 2007, NASA solicited proposals for the $175 million in unawarded first round funds. Some of the new contenders who entered before the deadline in November 2007 for the funding were Spacehab, t/Space, Andrews Space, PlanetSpace and SpaceDev.

In January 2008 industry sources claimed that the field had been downselected to four; Spacehab, Andrews Space, PlanetSpace and Orbital Sciences, with the announcement date set to February 7. Several sources later suggested that Boeing and not Andrews was a final contestant.

On February 19, 2008, the second round selection was made to Orbital Sciences Corporation, for the Cygnus spacecraft. NASA's selection statement showed that Orbital beat Boeing on expected lower costs and the added benefit of a new medium lift launcher Taurus II with Andrews, PlanetSpace and Spacehab being eliminated on funding concerns.

Following the original $500M Space Act Agreement, an additional $288M in "augmentation" funding was awarded to the two contractors before the demonstration flights.

Program conclusion
The COTS program was successfully concluded in November 2013 after two companies, SpaceX and Orbital Sciences, designed, built and launched "a pair of new spacecraft on rockets that also were newly designed".  NASA has published its own history of the COTS program including the controlling of the development program using Space Act Agreements (SAA), with lessons for future programs.

Awards
 Rocketplane Kistler — originally awarded contract worth $207 million; Rocketplane Kistler received only $32.1 million before NASA terminated their contract for failure to complete milestones in October 2007.
 SpaceX — awarded contract worth $278 million; in 2011 additional milestones were added bringing the total contract value to $396 million.  On May 22, 2012 SpaceX COTS Demo Flight 2 completed the NASA and SpaceX Space Act Agreement.  Falcon 9 #3 flew capsule Dragon C2+ to the International Space Station.  After rendezvousing, berthing and unloading the capsule successfully reentered landing in the Pacific Ocean.

 Orbital Sciences Corporation — awarded contract worth $170 million in the second round in February 2008; in 2011 additional milestones were added bringing the total contract value to $288 million. The Antares (rocket) made its maiden flight lifting a payload mass simulator to low Earth orbit (LEO) on April 21, 2013. On September 18, 2013, Antares successfully launched a Cygnus spacecraft to rendezvous with the International Space Station.

Competitors
More than twenty organizations submitted COTS proposals in March 2006 of which twenty were publicly disclosed. NASA received new COTS proposals from at least seven firms by November 21, 2007.

Commercial Resupply Services

On December 22, 2008, NASA stated they would discuss the contract selection to provide commercial cargo resupply services for the International Space Station.  NASA announced the awarding of contracts to both SpaceX and Orbital Sciences Corporation in a press conference on December 23, 2008.  The contracts include a minimum of 20 missions, 12 missions for SpaceX ($1.6 Billion) and 8 missions for Orbital Sciences ($1.9 Billion). PlanetSpace submitted a protest to the Government Accountability Office after receiving a NASA debriefing on the outcome of the award. On April 22, 2009 GAO publicly released its decision to deny the protest.

See also
Cargo spacecraft
Commercial Crew Development
Commercial off-the-shelf
Space Shuttle successors
Commercial Lunar Payload Services

References

External links
NASA's COTS webpage
COTS Space Act Agreements

Private spaceflight
NASA programs